The 2008 season of the Enterprise Football League (also known as the Fubon Enterprise Football League) was held from January 5 to April 27, 2008. With 4 college teams also participating, the number of competing teams increased from 4 to 8. The 2007 league champion Taiwan Power Company F.C. successfully defended the title. 

At the end of 2008, the Chinese Taipei Football Association decided to merge the Enterprise Football League into the Intercity Football League. As a result, this was the last Enterprise Football League season.

Teams
The 2008 league season consisted of 8 teams, 4 of which were existing teams from the 2007 season: Taipower (台電), Tatung (大同), Chinese Taipei U-23 (as Fubon Financial, 富邦), and the National Sports Training Center football team (國訓). Four additional college teams, Bros (悍創), E-United (義聯集團), Hun Sing (鴻鑫北體), and Molton Tso I (Molten佐儀), also participated in this season.

Semi-professional clubs
Taiwan Power Company F.C. (abbr. Taipower)
Tatung F.C.
Only Taipower and Tatung were eligible to represent Chinese Taipei in the AFC President's Cup.
National or military teams
Fubon Financial: Chinese Taipei National Under-23 football team
National Sports Training Center football team (NSTC)

College teams
Bros: Ming Chuan University football team
E-United: mainly I-Shou University football team 
Hun Sing: Taipei Physical Education College football team
Molten Tso I: National Taiwan College of Physical Education football team

Venues 
 Chungshan Soccer Stadium, Taipei (rounds 1-3, 8-10, 13-14)
 Kaohsiung County Stadium, Fongshan City (rounds 1-5, 8-12)
 I-Shou University, Kaohsiung (rounds 4-7, 11-12)
 Chung Cheng Industrial Vocational High School, Kaohsiung (rounds 6-7)
 Bailing Sports Park, Taipei (round 13-14)

League table

Results

Bottom section = first stage (rounds 1-7); Top section = second stage (rounds 8-14).

Season statistics 
 First goal of the season: Huang Jui-hao for National Sports Training Center football team against Fubon Financial (Chinese Taipei U-23) (January 5, 2008)
 Widest winning margin: 6 goals – Molten Tso I 6-0 Hun Sing
 Most goals in a match: 7 goals – Taipower 6-1 E-United

Top scorers

Awards 
 MVP: Huang Chiu-ching (Taipower)
 Best Manager: Chen Kuei-jen (Taipower)
 Golden Boot: Chang Han (Molten Tso I)
 Fair Play: Fubon Financial

See also 
 2008 in Taiwanese football

References

External links
Enterprise Football League 2008 regulations 
RSSSF

Top level Taiwanese football league seasons
Enterprise Football League seasons
Taipei
Taipei
1